O'Brien is a city in Haskell County, Texas, United States. The population was 132 at the time of the 2000 census. As of 2010, the O'Brien population was 106. O'Brien is located at the junction of Farm Road 2229 and Texas State Highway 6; the nearest large city is Abilene, 70 miles to the south. The area was hit by a destructive and deadly F4 tornado on March 13, 1953.

Geography

Demographics

As of the census of 2000,  132 people, 54 households, and 32 families resided in the city. The population density was 262.1 people per square mile (101.9/km). The 71 housing units averaged 141.0/sq mi (54.8/km). The racial makeup of the city was 61.36% White, 0.76% Native American, 37.88% from other races. Hispanics or Latinos of any race were 55.30% of the population.

Of the 54 households, 24.1% had children under the age of 18 living with them, 46.3% were married couples living together, 9.3% had a female householder with no husband present, and 40.7% were not families. About 38.9% of all households were made up of individuals, and 24.1% had someone living alone who was 65 years of age or older. The average household size was 2.44 and the average family size was 3.34.

In the city, the population was distributed as 25.0% under the age of 18, 10.6% from 18 to 24, 15.9% from 25 to 44, 23.5% from 45 to 64, and 25.0% who were 65 years of age or older. The median age was 44 years. For every 100 females, there were 71.4 males. For every 100 females age 18 and over, there were 59.7 males.

The median income for a household in the city was $17,500, and for a family was $18,750. Males had a median income of $25,000 versus $13,214 for females. The per capita income for the city was $10,422. About 22.2% of families and 18.7% of the population were living below the poverty line, including 20.0% of those under 18 and 16.7% of those over 64.

Education
The City of O'Brien is served by the Knox City-O'Brien Consolidated Independent School District.

In 1972, O'Brien won the first six-man football state championship in Texas.

References

Cities in Texas
Cities in Haskell County, Texas